Hegeler may refer to:

Hegeler (surname)
Hegeler, Vermillion County, Illinois, an unincorporated community in Vermillion County